Nalum may refer to:
 Nalum (Norway), an area in Larvik, Norway
 Martin Olsen Nalum, Norwegian educator and politician

See also 
 Ngalum